WORZ-LP (107.9 FM) was a radio station licensed to Key Largo, Florida, United States. The station was owned by Ocean Reef Radio Inc.

The Federal Communications Commission cancelled WORZ-LP's license on February 4, 2020, due to the station's failure to file an application for license renewal.

References

External links
 

ORZ-LP
ORZ-LP
2004 establishments in Florida
Radio stations established in 2004
Florida Keys
Defunct radio stations in the United States
Radio stations disestablished in 2020
2020 disestablishments in Florida
ORZ-LP
Defunct community radio stations in the United States